Donald Eck (born November 30, 1961) is a former American football coach. Until November 2021, he was the offensive coordinator at Clearfield High School in Clearfield, Utah, a position he held since the summer of 2020. Eck previously spent 28 years as an assistant coach at the collegiate and professional levels, including stints as offensive coordinator of the Berlin Thunder and Rhein Fire in NFL Europe. Eck was the original head coach at Corner Canyon High School in Draper, Utah. In 2021, he was fired from his coaching position at Clearfield High School over a harassing voicemail he left one of his players.

Playing career
Eck played as center for Utah from 1980 to 1982. He was voted Utah's Most Valuable Lineman all three years. He made the all-Western Athletic Conference (WAC) second team in both 1981 and 1982. Eck was team captain as a senior in 1982.

Coaching career
Eck began his coaching career as student assistant at Utah in 1983. After a one-year stint as assistant coach at Woods Cross High School (Utah) he returned to his alma mater in 1985, where he served two seasons as a graduate assistant before becoming the offensive line coach (1987–1989).

In 1990, Eck coached the centers and guards for Arizona’s Aloha Bowl team. From there, he went to James Madison as offensive line coach. The Dukes’ 1991 team finished 12th in the nation in total offense. He was promoted to assistant head coach/offensive line coach prior to the 1992 season.

Eck’s third coaching stint in Salt Lake City began in 1994, when he was added to Ron McBride’s Utah staff as offensive line coach. Also won the headman in 1987.

After leaving Utah, Eck spent five seasons in NFL Europe. He was the offensive line coach for the Scottish Claymores (2003) and served as offensive coordinator/offensive line coach for the Berlin Thunder (2004–2006) and Rhein Fire (2007).

Eck returned to college football in 2008 as the offensive line coach at Weber State. In January 2009, he was promoted to assistant head coach and offensive coordinator, but left WSU at the beginning of spring workouts to join the Las Vegas franchise of the United Football League.

In the summer of 2020, Eck took the job as the offensive coordinator at Clearfield High School in Clearfield Utah, coaching under former NFL player and Clearfield Alumni Andre Dyson.  Eck was fired from this position on Nov 23, 2021, for leaving a harassing voicemail on a student’s phone, which included, in part, "Hey, give me a call when you can. I want to meet with your parents, man, ’cause I keep hearing your mom’s putting all sorts of (expletive) on social media talking (expletive) about the coaches here and I’m gonna put a stop to that, bro."

References

External links
 Scottish Claymores bio

1961 births
Living people
American football centers
Arizona Wildcats football coaches
Berlin Thunder coaches
James Madison Dukes football coaches
Las Vegas Locomotives coaches
Rhein Fire coaches
Scottish Claymores coaches
Sportspeople from Los Angeles County, California
Utah Utes football coaches
Weber State Wildcats football coaches
High school football coaches in Utah
People from Norwalk, California
Players of American football from California